Hooked on Classics 2: Can't Stop the Classics is an album by Louis Clark and the Royal Philharmonic Orchestra, published in 1982 by K-tel, part of the Hooked on Classics series.

Track listing 

 Can't Stop the Classics - 5:48

 Ruslan and Lyudmila  Overture/ Mikhail Glinka
 Coppélia, Act 1, No. 8: Csárdás / Léo Delibes
 Piano Sonata No. 8 in C Minor, Op. 13, “Pathétique”, I: Allegro di molto e con brio / Ludwig van Beethoven
 Sylvia, Act 3, No. 18a: Divertissement- Pizzicato / Delibes
 Slavonic Dance No. 8 in G Minor, Op. 46/ Antonín Dvořák
 The Barber of Seville Overture / Gioachino Rossini
 The Snow Maiden Suite, IV: Dance of the Tumblers / Nikolai Rimsky-Korsakov
 The Four Seasons, Op. 8- Concerto No. 4 in F Minor, RV 297, “Winter”, I: Allegro non molto  / Antonio Vivaldi
 Étude in C Minor, Op. 10, No. 12, “Revolutionary” / Chopin
 Carnival Overture / Dvořák
 Hungarian Rhapsody No. 2 in C# Minor / Franz Liszt
 Gayane Suite No. 2, XI: Sabre Dance / Aram Khachaturian

 Hooked on America - 4:07

 Rhapsody in Blue / George Gershwin
 Camptown Races / Stephen Foster
 Rhapsody in Blue / Gershwin
 An American in Paris / Gershwin
 Rhapsody in Blue / Gershwin
 Symphony No. 9 in E Minor, Op. 95, "From the New World", I: Allegro molto / Dvořák
 Poor Old Joe / Foster
 Symphony No. 9 in E Minor, Op. 95, "From the New World", IV: Allegro con fuoco / Dvořák
 Dixie / Dan Emmett
 The Battle Hymn of the Republic / Howe-Steffe

 Hooked on Romance (Part 2) - 6:41

 Canon in D Major / Johann Pachelbel
 Enigma Variations, Op. 36, IX: Nimrod / Edward Elgar
 Piano Concerto No. 2 in C Minor, Op. 18, I: Moderato / Sergei Rachmaninoff
 Cavalleria Rusticana, Intermezzo / Pietro Mascagni
 Étude in E Major, Op. 10, No. 3 / Chopin
 Warsaw Concerto / Richard Addinsell
 Woodland Sketches, I: "To a Wild Rose" / Edward MacDowell
 Spartacus Suite No. 2, I: Adagio of Spartacus and Phrygia / Khachaturian
 Concierto de Aranjuez, II: Adagio / Joaquín Rodrigo

 Can't Stop the Classics (Part 2) - 6:30

 Fanfare Intro / Louis Clark
 Die Meistersinger von Nürnberg Overture / Richard Wagner
 Peter and the Wolf / Sergei Prokofiev
 Marche Slave / Tchaikovsky
 Cantata BWV 208, "Was mir behagt, ist nur die muntre Jagd, IX: "Schafe können sicher weiden" (Sheep May Safely Graze) / Johann Sebastian Bach
 Lohengrin, Act 3, No. 1: Bridal Chorus / Wagner
 Turandot, Act 3, "Nessun dorma" / Giacomo Puccini
 Aida, Act 2, Triumphal March / Giuseppe Verdi
 Für Elise (Bagatelle No. 25 in A Minor) / Beethoven
 Finlandia, Op. 26 / Jean Sibelius
 Piano Sonata No. 8 in C Minor, Op. 13, “Pathétique”, III: Rondo. Allegro / Beethoven
 Pomp and Circumstance March No. 4 in G Major / Elgar
 String Quartet in F Major, Op. 3, No. 5, II: Andante cantabile / Roman Hoffstetter
 String Quartet in C Major, Op. 76, No. 3, "Emperor", II: Poco adagio. Cantabile / Joseph Haydn
 Boléro / Maurice Ravel

 A Night at the Opera - 6:04

 Messiah, HWV 56, Part 2, No. 44: Hallelujah Chorus / George Frideric Handel
 The Pirates of Penzance, Act 2, No. 26: "With Cat-Like Tread" / Gilbert-Sullivan
 Symphony No. 9 in D Minor, Op. 125, IV: Presto- Allegro assai / Beethoven
 Il Trovatore, Act 2, No. 1, “Vedi! Le Fosche Notturne Spogli” (Anvil Chorus) / Verdi
 Carmen, Act 1, Prelude (Les Toréadors) / Bizet
 Faust, Act 4, Soldiers' Chorus  / Charles Gounod
 Rule, Britannia! / Thomson-Arne
 Carmen, Act 2, “Votre toast, je peux vous le rendre” (Toreador Song) / Bizet
 Messiah, HWV 56, Part 2, No. 44: Hallelujah Chorus / George Frideric Handel

 Tales of the Vienna Waltz - 4:04 (All music composed by Johann Strauss II)

 On the Beautiful Blue Danube Waltz, Op. 314 
 Die Fledermaus Overture
 Roses From the South Waltz, Op. 388
 On the Beautiful Blue Danube Waltz, Op. 314 
 Vienna Blood Waltz, Op. 354
 On the Beautiful Blue Danube Waltz, Op. 314
 Artists' Life Waltz, Op. 316
 On the Beautiful Blue Danube Waltz, Op. 314
 Tales from the Vienna Woods Waltz, Op. 325
 Morgenblätter Waltz, Op. 279
 On the Beautiful Blue Danube Waltz, Op. 314

 Hooked on Baroque - 4:23

 The Four Seasons, Op. 8- Concerto No. 4 in F Minor, RV 297, “Winter”, I: Allegro non molto / Vivaldi
 The Four Seasons, Op. 8- Concerto No. 1 in E Major, RV 269, “Spring”, I: Allegro / Vivaldi
 The Four Seasons, Op. 8- Concerto No. 2 in G Minor, RV 315, “Summer”, I: Allegro non molto / Vivaldi
 Harpsichord Suite No. 5 in E Major, HWV 430, IV: Aria con variazioni (The Harmonious Blacksmith) / Handel
 English Suite No. 2 in A Minor, BWV 807, V: Bourrée (No. 2) / Bach
 Flute Sonata in D Major, II: Allegro / Leonardo Vinci
 Brandenburg Concerto No. 5 in D Major, BWV 1050, I: Allegro / Bach
 Flute Concerto in G Major, III; Allegro / Giuseppe Tartini
 Flute Sonata No. 5 in E Minor, BWV 1034, II: Allegro / Bach
 Flute Sonata No. 7 in C Major, Op. 1, IV: Gavotte  / Handel
 Suite in A Minor, TWV 55:a2, II: Les Plaisirs / Georg Philipp Telemann
 Sonata for Violin and Keyboard No. 4 in C Minor, BWV 1017, IV: Allegro / Bach
 Flute Concerto in G Major, I: Allegro Spiritoso /Giovanni Battista Pergolesi
 The Four Seasons, Op. 8- Concerto No. 2 in G Minor, RV 315, “Summer”, I: Allegro non molto / Vivaldi
 The Four Seasons, Op. 8- Concerto No. 1 in F Minor, RV 297, “Winter”, I: Allegro non molto / Vivaldi

 If You Knew Sousa - 3:34

 The Liberty Bell / Sousa
 Blaze Away / Holzmann-Thurban
 Semper Fidelis / Sousa
 The Washington Post / Sousa

 If You Knew Sousa (And Friends) - 3:05

 Entrance of the Gladiators / Julius Fučík
 Colonel Bogey March / Kenneth J. Alford
 Royal Air Force March Past / Walford Davies
 Pomp and Circumstance March No. 1 in D Major / Elgar
 The Dam Busters March / Eric Coates
 The Stars and Stripes Forever / Sousa

References

1982 albums
Royal Philharmonic Orchestra albums
RCA Records albums
Hooked on Classics albums